The 1989–90 East Tennessee State Buccaneers basketball team represented East Tennessee State University during the 1989-90 NCAA Division I men's basketball season. The team was led by head coach Les Robinson. The Bucs finished the season 27–7 and 12–2 in Southern Conference play to finish in first place after the regular season. They won the Southern Conference tournament championship in Asheville to receive the automatic berth to the NCAA tournament as the No. 13 seed in the Southeast region. They lost to No. 4 seed, and eventual Final Four participant, Georgia Tech, 99–83 in the first round.

Roster

Source

Schedule and results

|-
!colspan=9 style=| Regular season

|-
!colspan=9| SoCon tournament

|-
!colspan=9| NCAA tournament

Source

Awards and honors
Keith Jennings – SoCon Player of the Year (Coaches)

References

East Tennessee State Buccaneers men's basketball seasons
East Tennessee State
East Tennessee State
East Tennessee
East Tennessee